Nar Ab (also Romanized as Nār Āb and Nārāb) is a village in Molla Yaqub Rural District, in the Central District of Sarab County, East Azerbaijan Province, Iran. At the 2006 census, its population was 175, in 35 families.

References 

Populated places in Sarab County